Want is the second studio album by American electronic music duo 3OH!3. It is their first album with record label Photo Finish. The album was produced by Matt Squire and 3OH!3. The track "Punkbitch" was included on the Warped Tour 2008 Tour Compilation.

Title

Nathaniel Motte said, "I was texting my brother or something about the tracks we were making. At one point he texted me back, saying, ‘I want it.’ So I began telling him how cool they were, and he just texted me back ‘WANT, WANT!’"

Critical reception 
The album has received mixed reviews. It charted on the Billboard 200, reaching a peak position of 44. Want received over 1.2 million individual track downloads.

Track listing 

Notes
  signifies a co-producer
  signifies a remix producer

Charts 
In Wants 22nd week on the Billboard 200, it rose from a peak of number 87 to set a new peak of number 44. Want has sold over 455,000 copies in the United States as of July 2010.

Weekly charts

Year-end charts

References 

2008 albums
3OH!3 albums
Albums produced by Benny Blanco
Photo Finish Records albums
Albums produced by Matt Squire